The World's End is a Grade II listed public house and restaurant at 459 King's Road, Chelsea, London. It gives its name to the surrounding area at the western end of the King's Road.

History
It was built in 1897, but the architect is not known. Historic England calls it "a fine example of a public house in the gin-palace genre".

The current building replaced earlier buildings, one of which is shown on the north side of Kings Road on the 1795 map; Cary's New And Accurate Plan Of London And Westminster. The old tavern was a noted house of entertainment in the reign of Charles II. The grounds and tea gardens were extensive and it was elegantly fitted out. The house was probably called "The World's End" because of its then considerable distance from London and the bad and dangerous state of the roads leading to it. As it stood close to the River Thames most of the visitors made the journey by boat.

Earlier buildings

See also
 The World's End, Camden

References

External links
 Worlds End, 459 Kings Road, Chelsea, London (UK Pub history research and London historical street directory)

Pubs in the Royal Borough of Kensington and Chelsea
Grade II listed pubs in London
Chelsea, London
Grade II listed buildings in the Royal Borough of Kensington and Chelsea
King's Road, Chelsea, London